This bibliography of works on Thomas Jefferson is a comprehensive list of published works about Thomas Jefferson, the primary author of the Declaration of Independence and the third president of the United States. Biographical and political accounts for Jefferson now span across three centuries. Up until 1851, virtually all biographical accounts for Jefferson relied on general and common knowledge gained from official records and public writings and newspapers. It wasn't until Henry S. Randall—the first historian allowed to interview Jefferson's family, giving him access to family letters and records—did biographies of Jefferson take on a more intimate perspective. Randall wrote an 1858 three-volume biography which set the premise for many biographies that followed.  Before Randall, George Tucker produced his two-volume 1837 account of Jefferson which offered a glint of insight into Jefferson's personal life. Following Jefferson's death he was roundly criticized by the Christian Clergy for his Bible and other writings. Tucker was the first notable historian to explore Jefferson's religious life from a biographical perspective. Though scrutinized by some historians before, during the 1960s civil rights era, historians, many of them with political and social motivations, began criticizing Jefferson for owning slaves and his racial views. While some of their accounts were unforgiving with their often selective points of view, others have noted that Jefferson, while owning slaves and reluctant to release them into freedom unprepared, was among the first of his time to advance the idea of equality and freedom for the African descendants enslaved in the new world. Many of the older biographical works are now in the public domain and often available online in their entirety in the form of e-books, while later publications whose copyrights are still valid can often be partially viewed on the internet.

Jefferson overview

Thomas Jefferson (April 13, 1743 – July 4, 1826) was an American Founding Father, the principal author of the Declaration of Independence (1776) and the third president of the United States (1801–1809). He served in the Continental Congress, and as a wartime Governor of Virginia (1779–1781). From mid-1784 Jefferson served as a diplomat, stationed in Paris. In May 1785, he became the United States Minister to France.

Jefferson was the first United States Secretary of State (1790–1793) serving under President George Washington. Jefferson and James Madison, organized the Democratic-Republican Party, and subsequently resigned from Washington's cabinet. He was elected Vice President in 1796. He wrote the Kentucky and Virginia Resolutions, which attempted to nullify the Alien and Sedition Acts.

As president Jefferson promoted and authorized the Louisiana Purchase from France (1803), and sent the Lewis and Clark Expedition (1804–1806) to explore the new west.  His vice president, Aaron Burr, was tried for treason. Hoping to avert war he attempted economic warfare against Britain with his embargo laws. In 1807 he drafted and signed into law a bill banning the importation of slaves into the United States.

Jefferson was a leader in the Enlightenment. He founded the University of Virginia after his presidency. He designed his own large mansion at Monticello and the University of Virginia building. Jefferson was a skilled writer and corresponded with many influential people in America and Europe throughout his adult life. His letters number in the many thousands and are used extensively as references for nearly all works on Jefferson.

Bernard Bailyn on the Jefferson Papers
Historian Bernard Bailyn perused the Jefferson Papers after 1760 and concluded---in "Boyd's Jefferson: Notes for a Sketch" (1960)---that the documents revealed two defining Jeffersonian characteristics. The first was "liberal conventionality," which partly conformed with Carl L. Becker's appraisals of Jeffersonian "liberalism" in The Declaration of Independence: A Study in the History of Political Ideas (1922). Becker's interpretations of Jeffersonian "liberalism" in drafts of The Declaration of Independence (1776) evinced a change from Becker's Progressive Era social liberalism to questioning, particularly after the First Red Scare, the relevance of any natural rights philosophy to early twentieth-century modernities and imperialism, all in the context of fledgling formulations of Jeffersonian democracy. Whether Bailyn anachronistically construed the shift in Becker's interpretations as nascent (more than the dreaded "proto-") Cold War liberalism requires further scholarly inquiry. Bailyn nevertheless added that this Jeffersonian "liberal conventionality" frequently lapsed into the "superficial" and "simple." As an example, Bailyn compared James Madison's contentions in the Virginia Plan and The Federalist Papers to those of Jefferson, who "saw the problem in traditional liberal terms, as [only] a dilemma created by the necessity to increase the powers of the national government and the threat that such powers would constitute to the liberties of the people." Jefferson, in his "liberal conventionality" vis-à-vis the "function of bills of rights," believed that "the real threats to liberty in a republican government come not from the power of the state as such but from 'overbearing majorities.' " Another example was Jefferson's conception of the French Revolution. "It was this liberal conventionality," Bailyn decided, that "engrossed his attention" on French Revolutionary aims to "remodel the institutions of government to conform to enlightenment principles. All else---the latent, irrational elements involved in a social upheaval: the powerful resistance of entrenched privilege, the capricious violence of enflamed mobs, the irresponsibility of demagogues---took him by surprise...Jefferson may have been convinced by his own argument that 'vices in the form of government' lay at the heart of Europe's miseries, but others---more consistent empiricists, more original, dissatisfied, quizzical minds---were not."

A second characteristic spurred a challenge to Carl L. Becker's thesis on an ancillary front. In Bailyn's estimation, Thomas Jefferson proved a "superb 'man of business' " which furthered "plans of his own, plans calculated to advance the cause of America, enlightenment, and liberty." Bailyn subsequently questioned the prevailing "view that Jefferson's 'convictions, his sympathies, his ideas are essentially of the intellect, somehow curiously abstracted from reality'...this conclusion of Becker's appears considerably overdrawn even as it relates to the Declaration; as a general description of Jefferson's personality it is utterly mistaken." Bailyn depicted a deft Jefferson transitioning, time and time again, from fiscal and monetary proposals for "public debt" reduction to those decisions in public commerce and private "finance" that so impressed John Adams. Bailyn also cast Jefferson as an "excellent ambassador" for "American commerce," citing his successful efforts to "re-open the markets for American whale oil" and challenges against the "farmers-general's monopolistic control of French imports of American tobacco." As a result, "Madison, next to whose comments on constitutional principle and theory Jefferson's remarks were rigid and obvious, found his opinion of men and measures penetrating and reliable."

Bailyn's conclusion advanced elements of what became The Ideological Origins of the American Revolution as well as Gordon S. Wood's "Rhetoric and Reality in the American Revolution" (1966). The dual characteristics failed to consistently occupy separate spheres in Thomas Jefferson's writings---often, according to Bailyn, they were a dyadic pair rather than solely correlative, asymptotically approaching ontological singularity. Before Jefferson embarked for Europe in 1784, Bailyn forcefully argued, the "means" of the American Revolution had been "necessarily subordinated to the end of survival, and the most effective ideas were the most ideological, the most universally evocative of idealism and self-sacrifice. In this situation of flux the conflict between self-sufficient abstractions and material and social reality was at a minimum." But after 1784, these characteristics increasingly came into conflict as debates over "effective ideas" at their "most ideological" shifted the American Revolution in a different direction(s). Jefferson, for instance, began to study more conceptual underpinnings of the federal Constitution than his initial "dilemma," especially as "he came to grips with the concrete problems, learned more of the political battles that had taken place in the convention, and became caught up, even at such a distance, in the campaign for ratification." Yet, "at other times, as in his involvement in the early stages of the French Revolution, this weak integration of contrasting characteristics led to simultaneous but quite different responses at different levels of activity. At still other times, as in the negotiation of commercial arrangements, it led to an appearance of applying different principles to similar circumstances. It could easily result in apparent inconsistencies which animosity could construe as hypocrisy." These "problems" appeared more manifest after "the conflict between self-sufficient abstractions and material and social reality" was no longer "at a minimum." The "problems" were not only features of an "important biography; they are elements of our national history."

Legend
Sources and publications for Jefferson have emerged for more than 200 years and at this late date there exist many hundreds of them. As such this bibliography, though extensive, is by no means complete at this time. This bibliography also contains books whose titles and subjects are not devoted to Thomas Jefferson per se, but whose content covers the subject of Jefferson well enough for their inclusion in this bibliography.

Note: Some publications make no reference to Location and/or have no ISBN. Unlike bibliographies in subject articles, "Cite book" templates are not used here because too many templates on one page often causes server overload, which often causes load/save problems.

Bibliography
 Clements, William L. (1943). Thomas Jefferson, 1743–1943: A Guide to the Rare Books, Maps & Manuscripts Exhibited at the University of Michigan, William L. Clements Library, University of Michigan, 32 pages; Book
 Fitzgerald, Carol B. (1991). Thomas Jefferson: A Bibliography (Meckler's Bibliographies of the presidents of the U.S.)  400 pages; ; Book
 Johnston, Richard Holland (1905). A Contribution to a Bibliography of Thomas Jefferson, Library of Congress, 73 pages; e-Book
 Shuffleton, Frank (1983). Thomas Jefferson: A Comprehensive, Annotated Bibliography of Writings about Him, 1826–1980, 486 pages and Thomas Jefferson, 1981–1990: An Annotated Bibliography (New York: Garland Pub., 1992) 283 pages;

Biographical
 McDonald, ed.  Robert M. S. Thomas Jefferson's Lives: Biographers and the Battle for History (2019)  DOI: 10.2307/j.ctvn1tbj9 online
 Adams, James Truslow (1936). The Living Jefferson, C. Scribner's Sons, 403 pages; Book
 Appleby, Joyce (2003). Thomas Jefferson Thomas Jefferson: The American presidents Series: The 3rd President, 1801–1809, Macmillan, 184 pages;  Book
 Bear, James Adam (1967).
 ——; Nichols, Frederick Doveton; Thomas Jefferson Memorial Foundation, Inc. (1967). Monticello, Thomas Jefferson Memorial Foundation, 77 pages; Book
 Barrett, Marvin (1968). "Meet Thomas Jefferson", Random House, 80 pages. Illustrated by Angelo Torres. 
 Bernstein, Richard. B. (2003). Thomas Jefferson, Oxford University Press, 288 pages; Book
 Bober, Natalie (2008). Thomas Jefferson: Draftsman of a Nation, University of Virginia Press, 360 pages; ; Book
 Boles, John B. (2010). Seeing Jefferson Anew: In His Time and Ours, University of Virginia Press; 224 pages , Book
   
 Bottorff, William K. (1979). Thomas Jefferson, Twayne Publishers, 162 pages; ; Book
 
 —— (1945). The Young Jefferson 1743–1789, Houghton Mifflin Company, 544 pages; e'Book  
 Brodie, Fawn McKay (1974). Thomas Jefferson: An Intimate History, W.W. Norton,  594 pages; Book
 Brown, David Scott (1998). Thomas Jefferson: A Biographical Companion, Abc-Clio Incorporated, 266 pages; ; Book
 Brown, Stuart Gerry (1963) Thomas Jefferson, Washington Square Press, 247 pages; Book
 Browne, Stephen H. (2003). Jefferson's Call for Nationhood: The First Inaugural Address, Texas A&M University Press, 155 pages; ; Book
 Burke, Rick (2002). Thomas Jefferson, Capstone Classroom, 32 pages; Book
 Burstein, Andrew (1995).The Inner Jefferson: Portrait of a Grieving Optimist, University Press of Virginia, 334 pages; ; Book
 —— (2005).
 ——; Isenberg, Nancy (2010). Madison and Jefferson, Random House LLC, 809 pages; ; Book
 Catlett, Lowell B. (2004). Thomas Jefferson: A Free Mind, Trafford Publishing, 164 pages; ; Book
 Cogliano, Francis D. (2011). A Companion to Thomas Jefferson, John Wiley & Sons, 608 pages; ; Book
 Craughwell, Thomas J. (2012). Thomas Jefferson's Crème Brûlée, Quirk Books, Philadelphia, 233 pages; ; Book
 Crawford, Alan Pell (2008). Twilight at Monticello, Random House, New York, 322 pages; Book
 Cunningham, Noble E. (1988). In Pursuit of Reason, Random House Publishing Group, 414 pages; Book; well-reviewed short biography
 —— (2001). The Inaugural Addresses of President Thomas Jefferson, 1801 And 1805, University of Missouri Press, 122 pages; ; Book
 Curtis, William Eleroy (1901). The True Thomas Jefferson, J.B. Lippincott, 395 pages; e'Book1, e'Book2
 Davis, Thomas Jefferson (1876). A Sketch of the Life, Character, and Public Services of Thomas Jefferson, Claxton, Remsen & Haffelfinger, 167 pages; e'Book1, e'Book2
 Dwight, Theodore (1839). The character of Thomas Jefferson, as exhibited in his own writings, Weeks, Jordan & Company, Boston, 371 pages; e'Book1, e'Book2
 Ellis, Edward Sylvester (1898). Thomas Jefferson: a character sketch, The University association, 112 pages; e'Book
 Ellis, Joseph (1998).American Sphinx: The Character of Thomas Jefferson, Knopf Doubleday Publishing Group, 464 pages Book
 Fleming, Thomas J. (1969). The Man from Monticello: An Intimate Life of Thomas Jefferson, William Morrow, Publisher, 409 pages; Book
 Gabler, James M. (1995). Passions: The Wines and Travels of Thomas Jefferson. Bacchus Press Ltd, Publisher. 318 pages;
 Gilpin, Henry Dilworth (1828). A biographical sketch of Thomas Jefferson, 372 pages; e'Book1, e'Book2
 Gordon-Reed, Annette (2008). The Hemingses of Monticello: An American Family, W. W. Norton & Company 798 pages; Book
 Halliday, E. M. (2009). Understanding Thomas Jefferson, Perennial Harper Collins, New York, 304 pages; ; Book
 Hayes, Kevin J. (2008). The Road to Monticello: The Life and Mind of Thomas Jefferson, Oxford University Press, 752 pages; ; Book
 Hazelton, Mary; Wade, Blanchard (1930). The Boy who Loved Freedom: The Story of Thomas Jefferson, D. Appleton, 234 pages; Book
 Hitchens, Christopher (2005). Thomas Jefferson: Author of America, HarperCollins, 208 pages; ; Book
 , Book
  
 Jefferson Club Association (1902). The Pilgrimage to Monticello: The Home and Tomb of Thomas Jefferson, Con. P. Curran Printing Company. Monticello, Virginia; 78 pages; e'Book
 Johnston, Johanna (1961). Thomas Jefferson: his many talents, Dodd, Mead, Publishers, 160 pages; Book
 Jones, Veda Boyd (2000). Thomas Jefferson: Author of the Declaration of Independence, Facts On File, Incorporated, 80 pages; ; Book
 Judson, Clara Ingram (1952). Thomas Jefferson, champion of the people, Wilcox and Follett Co., 224 pages; Book
 Kaplan, Lawrence S. (1999). Thomas Jefferson: Westward the Course of Empire, Rowman & Littlefield, 198 pages; ; Book
 Kimball, Marie (2007). Jefferson – The Scene of Europe 1784 to 1789, Read Books, 388 pages; ; Book
  —— (1943).  Jefferson: The Road to Glory, 1743 to 1776, Coward-McCann, Incorporated, 358 pages; Book
 Koch, Adrienne (1971). Jefferson, Prentice-Hall, 180 pages; Book
 Kranish, Michael (2010). Flight from Monticello: Thomas Jefferson at War, Oxford University Press, 400 pages; ; Book
 Kuper, Theodore Fred (1968). Thomas Jefferson Still Lives, Arthur Price Foundation, 32 pages; Book
 Langhorne, Elizabeth Coles (1987). Monticello, a Family Story, Algonquin Books, 289 pages; ; Book
 Linn, William (1843). The Life of Thomas Jefferson: Author of the Declaration of Independence, and Third President of the United States, Andrus, Woodruff, & Gauntlett, 267 pages; e'Book
 Lisitzky, Gene (1933). Thomas Jefferson, The Viking Press, 356 pages; Book
 Lyman, T.P.H. (1826). The life of Thomas Jefferson: esq., LL. D., late ex president of the United , D & S Neall, Philadelphia, 111 pages; e'Book
 Malone, Dumas. Jefferson and His Time, 6 vols. (1948–82), Little Brown and Company, Boston; Six-volume biography of Thomas Jefferson by leading expert; the major scholarly study; Pulitzer Prize; A short version is online
 Jefferson the Virginian (1948), 413 pages; e'Book
 Jefferson and the Rights of Man (1951). e'Book (text), e'Books
 Jefferson and the Ordeal of Liberty (1962). 545 pages; Book, e'Books
 Jefferson the President: First Term, 1801–1805 (1970). Book
 Jefferson the President: Second Term, 1805–1809 (1974). 704 pages, Book
 Jefferson and his time: The Sage of Monticello (1981). 551 pages; Book
 —— (1963).   Thomas Jefferson as Political Leader, University of California Press, 75 pages; Book
 —— (1961). Dictionary of American Biography, Vol V, Thomas Jefferson, Charles Scribner's Sons, New York e'Book
 Mapp, Alf (1987). Thomas Jefferson: A Strange Case of Mistaken Identity, Madison Books,  487 pages;     Book
 —— (2009). Thomas Jefferson: Passionate Pilgrim, Rowman & Littlefield, 445 pages; ; Book
 
 Mayo, Bernard (1970). Jefferson Himself: The Personal Narrative of a Many-Sided American, University of Virginia Press, 384 pages; ; Book
 Mclean, Dabney N. (1996). The English ancestry of Thomas Jefferson, Clearfield, ; 84 pages; Book
 Mclaughlin, Jack (1990) Jefferson and Monticello: The Biography of a Builder, Macmillan, 496 pages;  Url
 McEwan, Barbara (1991). Thomas Jefferson, Farmer, McFarland, 219 pages; ; Book
 Meacham, Jon (2012). Thomas Jefferson: The Art of Power, Random House LLC, 764 pages, Book
 Meltzer, Milton (1991). Thomas Jefferson, the Revolutionary Aristocrat, F. Watts, 255 pages; ; Book
 —— (ed.) (1986). Thomas Jefferson: A Reference Biography: 24 essays by leading scholars on aspects of Jefferson's career.
 Merwin, Henry Childs (1901). Thomas Jefferson, Houghton, Mifflin, 164 pages; E'book
 Morse, John Torrey, Jr. (1885). Thomas Jefferson, Houghton, Mifflin and Company, Boston, 344 pages; E'book1, E'book2
 Mullin, Rita Thievon (2007). Thomas Jefferson: Architect of Freedom, Sterling Publishing Company, 124 pages; ; Book
 Muzzey, David Saville (1918). Thomas Jefferson, C. Scribner's Sons, New York, 319 pages; E'book1, E'book2
 Onuf, Peter (2007). The Mind of Thomas Jefferson, University of Virginia Press, 281 pages; ; Book
 —— (2016). Most Blessed of the Patriarchs: Thomas Jefferson and the Empire of the Imagination, W. W. Norton & Company,  Book 
 Parton, James (1883). Life of Thomas Jefferson, Third President of the United States, Houghton, Mifflin and Company, 764 pages; E'book
 Passos, John Dos (1954). The Head and Heart of Thomas Jefferson, Doubleday, Incorporated, 442 pages; Book
 Patterson, Charles (2000). Thomas Jefferson, iUniverse, 108 pages; ; Book
 Pettengill, Samuel B. (2007). Jefferson – The Forgotten Man, Read Books, 316 pages; ; Book
 Peterson, Merrill D. (1970). Thomas Jefferson and the New Nation, A standard scholarly biography; Oxford University Press, 1104 pages; Book.
 Phillips, Kevin (2012). 1775 – A Good Year for Revolution, Viking Press, 628 pages; 
 Pierson, Rev. Hamilton W. (1862). Jefferson at Monticello. The Private Life of Thomas Jefferson. (from entirely new Materials with numerous facsimiles), Charles Scribner, New York; (Original from the University of Michigan), 138 pages; e'Book1, e'Book2
 Randall, Henry Stephens (1858). The Life of Thomas Jefferson, Volume I, Derby & Jackson, New York, 645 pages; e'Book1, e'Book2
 —— (1858). The Life of Thomas Jefferson, Volume II, Derby & Jackson, New York, 694 pages; e'Book, e'Book2
 —— (1858). The Life of Thomas Jefferson, Volume III, Derby & Jackson, New York, 731 pages; e'Book1, e'Book2

 Randall, Willard Sterne (1994). Thomas Jefferson: A Life, Harper Collins, 736 pages; . Book; popular biography
 Rayner, B. L. (1832). Sketches of the life, writings, and opinions of Thomas Jefferson, A. Francis and W. Boardman, 556 pages; e'Book
 Reed, Annette Gordon; Onuf, Peter S. (2016). "Most Blessed of the Patriarchs": Thomas Jefferson and the Empire of the Imagination; Liveright Publishers,  Book
 Reef, Catherine (1991). Monticello, Dillon Press, 71 pages; ; Book
 Rhodes, Thomas L.; Lord, Frank B. (1947). The story of Monticello, The Pridemark Press, 94 pages; Book
 Rosenberger, Francis Coleman (1953). Jefferson Reader: A Treasury of Writings about Thomas Jefferson, E. P. Dutton, 349 pages; Book, e'Book
 Russell, Phillips (1956). Jefferson, champion of the free mind, Dodd, Mead, 374 pages; Book
 Salgo, Sandor (2000). Thomas Jefferson: Musician and Violinist, A book detailing Thomas Jefferson's love of music, Thomas Jefferson Foundation, 75 pages; ; Book
 Santrey, Laurence (1985). Thomas Jefferson, Troll Associates, 30 pages; ; Book
 Schachner, Nathan (1957). Thomas Jefferson: A Biography 2 volumes, T. Yoseloff, 1070 pages, Book
 Schachner, Nathan (1951). Thomas Jefferson: A Biography, Appleton-Century-Crofts, 1070 pages; Book
 Scharff, Virginia (2010). The Women Jefferson Loved, HarperCollins, 496 pages; ; Book
 Schmucker, Samuel Mosheim; Ketcham, Henry (1903). The Life of Thomas Jefferson, A. L. Burt company, New York, 345 pages; e'Book
 Schouler, James (1882). History of the United States of America Under the Constitution, Volume 2, William H. Morrison, New York, 472 pages; e'Book1, e'Book2
  ——  (1893). Thomas Jefferson, Dodd, Mead, New York, 252 pages; e'Book1, e'Book2
 Sheean, Vicent (1953). Thomas Jefferson: father of democracy, New York : Random House, 184 pages; Book1, E'book2
 Shuffelton, Frank (2012). The Cambridge Companion to Thomas Jefferson, Cambridge University Press, 212 pages; ; Book
 Simpson, Lloyd D. (1885). Notes on Thomas Jefferson, Sherman & Co., Printers, 182 pages; e'Book1, e'Book2
 Simpson, Stephen (1833). The lives of George Washington and Thomas Jefferson, H. Young, 389 pages; e'Book
 
 Smith, Page (1976). Jefferson: a revealing biography, American Heritage Publishing Company / McGraw-Hill, 310 pages; Book
 Stein, Susan (1993). The worlds of Thomas Jefferson at Monticello, H.N. Abrams, in association with the Thomas Jefferson Memorial Foundation, Inc., 472 pages; Book
 Smucker, Samuel Mosheim (1857). The life and times of Thomas Jefferson, Evans, 400 pages; e'Book1, e'Book2
 Staloff, Darren (2007).Hamilton, Adams, Jefferson: The Politics of Enlightenment and the American Founding, Macmillan, 432 pages; Book
 Stone, Eugene E. (1922). The story of Thomas Jefferson, Barse & Hopkins, 174 pages; e'Book
 Thomas Jefferson Bicentennial Commission (1943). Thomas Jefferson, author of the declaration of American independence, Thomas Jefferson Bicentennial Commission, 35 pages; Book
 Trueit, Trudi Strain (2009). Thomas Jefferson, Marshall Cavendish, 112 pages; ; Book
 Tucker, George (1837). The Life of Thomas Jefferson, Third President of the United States, in two volumes; Carey, Lea & Blanchard, Philadelphia, 537 and 545 pages respectively; e'Book, Vol.1, Vol.2
 —— (1838). Defense of the character of Thomas Jefferson, against a writer in the New-York review, New-York, W. Osborn, 48 pages; e'Book
  Watson, Thomas E. (1900). Thomas Jefferson, Small, Maynard & company, Boston, 153 pages; e'Book1,e'Book2
 —— (1903). The life and times of Thomas Jefferson, D. Appleton and company, New York, 534 pages; e'Book1, e'Book2
 Webster, Nathan Burnham (1890). Thomas Jefferson, J. B. Lippincott Company, 7 pages; e'Book
 Wibberley, Leonard (1963). Man of Liberty: A Life of Thomas Jefferson, Farrar, Straus and Giroux, 404 pages; ; e'Book1, e'Book2
 Wiencek, Henry (2012). Master of the Mountain, Macmillan, 336 pages; ; Book
 Wilbur, Marguerite Eyer (1962). Thomas Jefferson, apostle of liberty, Liveright Pub. Corp., 417 pages; Book
 Wilstach, Paul (1925). Jefferson and Monticello, Doubleday, New York, 258 pages; e'Book

Declaration of Independence
 Allen, Danielle (2014). Our Declaration, Liveright Publishing Corporation, New York / London, 317 pages; 
 Armitage, David (2007). The Declaration of Independence: A Global History, Harvard University Press, 300 pages; ; Book
 Becker, Carl (1970). The Declaration of Independence: A Study in the History of Political Ideas, Vintage Books, ; e'Book
 Bergen, Frank (1898). The Other Side of the Declaration of Independence: A Lecture, Elizabeth Journal Print, 45 pages; e'Book
 Boyd, Julian P.; Gawalt, Gerard W. (1999). The Declaration of Independence: The Evolution of the Text, University Press of New England, Book
 Buchanan, Roberdeau (1890). Observations on the Declaration of Independence : with a critical examination of the facts attending its attestation, Inquirer Printing Company, Lancaster, Pa. 20 pages; e'Book
 Casey, Robert E. (1927). The Declaration of independence: illustrated story of its adoption, with the biographies ..., Illustrated Publishers, 192 pages; e'Book
 Corn, Ira G. (1977). The story of the Declaration of Independence, Corwin Books, 228 pages; ; Book
 Dershowitz, Alan (2003). America Declares Independence, Wiley, 196 pages; ; Book
 Donaldson, Thomas (1898). The house in which Thomas Jefferson wrote the Declaration of Independence. Avil Printing Co., Philadelphia, 119 pages; e'Book
 Fliegelman, Jay (1993). Declaring Independence: Jefferson, Natural Language & the Culture of Performance, Stanford University Press, 268 pages; ; Book
 Friedenwald, Herbert (1904). The Declaration of Independence: An Interpretation and an Analysis, Macmillan, 299 pages; e'Book
 Hawke, David Freeman (1976). Honorable treason: the Declaration of Independence and the men who signed it, Viking Press, 240 pages; Book
 Hazelton, John Hampden (1906). The Declaration of Independence: Its History, Dodd, Mead, New York; 627 pages; e'Book
 Jayne, Allen (2000). Jefferson's Declaration of Independence: Origins, Philosophy and Theology; traces TJ's sources and emphasizes his incorporation of Deist theology into the Declaration.
 Kaminski, John P. (1995). A Necessary Evil?: Slavery and the Debate Over the Constitution, Rowman & Littlefield, 289 pages; ; Book
 Lossing, Benson John (2012). Lives of the Signers of the Declaration of Independence, Tales End Press; ; Book
 Maier, Pauline (2013). American Scripture: Making the Declaration of Independence, Random House LLC, 336 pages; ; Book
 Malone, Dumas (1954). The Story of the Declaration of Independence, Oxford University Press, 282 pages; Book
 Michael, William Henry (1904). The Declaration of Independence, U.S. Government Printing Office, 99 pages; E'book1, e'Book2
 Perrault, John (2009). Jefferson's dream: the ballad of the Declaration of IndependenceHobblebush Books, 80 pages; ; Book
 Thacher, John Boyd (1907). The Declaration of Independence, The North American Review, e'Book
 Wills, Garry (2002). Inventing America: Jefferson's Declaration of Independence, Houghton Mifflin Harcourt, 398 pages; ; Book

Politics and ideas
 Ackerman, Bruce (2009). The Failure of the Founding Fathers: Jefferson, Marshall, and the Rise of Presidential Democracy, Harvard University Press, 400 pages; Book
 Adair, Douglass; Yellin, Mark E. (Ed.) (2000). The Intellectual Origins of Jeffersonian Democracy: Republicanism, the Class Struggle, and the Virtuous Farmer, Lexington Books, 185 pages; ; Book
 Adams, Henry (1889). History of the United States of America during the Administrations of Thomas Jefferson (1889–1891, Charles Scribner's Sons; Library of America edition 1986) famous 9-volume history; e'Book
 —— (1891). History of the United States of America during the administration of Thomas Jefferson, vol.i, Charles Scribner's Sons, New York, 456 pages, E'book1, E'book2
 —— (1889). History of the United States of America during the administration of Thomas Jefferson, vol.ii, Charles Scribner's Sons, New York, 456 pages, E'book
 —— (1889). History of the United States of America during the second administration of Thomas Jefferson, vol.iii, Charles Scribner's Sons, New York, 471 pages, E'book
 —— (1890). History of the United States of America during the second administration of Thomas Jefferson, vol.iv, Charles Scribner's Sons, New York, 502 pages, E'book
 —— (1947). The formative years: a history of the United States during the administrations of Jefferson and Madison, Houghton Mifflin Company, 1067 pages; Book, E'book
 Adams, Herbert Baxter (1888). Thomas Jefferson and the University of Virginia, U.S. Government Printing Office, 308 pages; e'Book
 Adams, William Howard (2000). The Paris Years of Thomas Jefferson, Yale University Press, 368 pages; ; Book
 Allen, Steven W. (2003). Founding Fathers: Uncommon Heroes, Legal Awareness Series, Incorporated, 314 pages; ; Book
 Alvord, Clarence Walworth; Washburne, Elihu Benjamin (1920). Governor Edward Coles, Volume 15, Trustees of the Illinois State Historical Library, 435 pages; e'Book1, e'Book2
 Ambrose, Stephen E. (1996). Undaunted Courage: Meriwether Lewis, Thomas Jefferson, and the Opening of the American West, Simon and Schuster, New York, 511 pages; ; Book
 Anderson, Frank Maloy (1900). Contemporary opinion of the Virginia and Kentucky resolutions, American Historical Review, e'Book1, e'Book2
 Arrowood, Charles Flinn (1930). Thomas Jefferson And Education in a Republic, McGraw Hill Book Company Inc, 184 pages; e'Book

 Bailey, Jeremy D. (2007). Thomas Jefferson and Executive Power, Cambridge University Press, 280 pages; ; Book
 Bailey, John (2013). Jefferson's Second Father, Pan, 328 pages; ; Book
 Bailyn, Bernard (1992). The Ideological Origins of the American Revolution, Harvard University Press, 396 pages; ; Book
 Banning, Lance (1980). The Jeffersonian Persuasion: Evolution of a Party Ideology, Cornell University Press, 307 pages; ; Book
 —— (1995). Jefferson and Madison: Three Conversations from the Founding, Rowman & Littlefield, 256 pages; ; Book
 Beard, Charles Austin (1915). Economic Origins of Jeffersonian Democracy, Macmillan, New York, Boston, 474 pages; e'Book
 Bedini, Silvio A. (1990). Thomas Jefferson: statesman of science, Macmillan, 616 pages; ; Book
 Beloff, Baron Max Beloff (1948). Thomas Jefferson and American democracy, Hodder & Stoughton, 271 pages; Book
 Benson, C. Randolph (1971). Thomas Jefferson as social scientist, Fairleigh Dickinson University Press, 333 pages; 9780838677056; Book
 Berman, Eleanor Davidson (1947). Thomas Jefferson among the arts: an essay in early American esthetics, Philosophical Library, 305 pages; Book
 Bernstein, Richard B. (2004).
 Blunt, Ray (2012). Crossed Lives-Crossed Purposes: Why Thomas Jefferson Failed and William Willberforce Persisted in Leading an End to Slavery, Wipf and Stock Publishers, 292 pages; ; Book
 Boles, John B.; Hall, Randal L. (2010). Seeing Jefferson Anew: In His Time and Ours, University of Virginia Press, 224 pages; ; Book
 Boorstin, Daniel J. (1993). The Lost World of Thomas Jefferson, University of Chicago Press, 320 pages; ; Book
 Boutell, Lewis Henry (1891). Thomas Jefferson, the Man of Letters, Private printing: Press of S. Thompson & Company, 73 pages; E'book1, E'book2
 Bowen, Catherine Drinker (1986). Miracle at Philadelphia: The Story of the Constitutional Convention May to September 1787, Turtleback Books, 346 pages; ; Book
 Bowers, Claude G. (1936). Jefferson in Power The Death Struggle of the Federalist, Houghton Mifflin Company, 538 pages; E'book
 —— Jefferson And Hamilton The Struggle For Democracy in America, Kessinger Publishing, 560 pages; ; Book
 Brown, Stuart Gerry (1954). The First Republicans: Political Philosophy and Public Policy in the Party of Jefferson and Madison, Book
 Browne, Charles Albert (1944). Thomas Jefferson and the Scientific Trends of His Time, Chronica botanica Company, 423 pages; Book
 Burton, Cynthia H. (2005). Jefferson vindicated: fallacies, omissions, and contradictions in the Hemings genealogical search, Cynthia H. Burton, 194 pages; ; Book
 Butler, Benjamin Franklin (1840). Jeffersonian democracy: defined and vindicated, New York Standard, 8 pages; Book

 Cerami, Charles (2004). Jefferson's Great Gamble: The Remarkable Story of Jefferson, Napoleon and the Men Behind the Louisiana Purchase, Sourcebooks, Inc., 320 pages; ; Book
 —— (2005). Young Patriots: The Remarkable Story of Two Men, Their Impossible Plan, and the Revolution that Created the Constitution, Sourcebooks, Inc., 354 pages; ; Book
 —— (2002). Benjamin Banneker: Surveyor, Astronomer, Publisher, Patriot, John Wiley & Sons, 257 pages; ; Book
 —— (2008). Dinner at Mr. Jefferson's, John Wiley & Sons. ,  270 pages
 Channing, Edward (1906). The Jeffersonian System: 1801–1811, Harper & Brothers, New York, 299 pages; e'Book1, e'Book2
 Chinard, Gilbert (2011). Thomas Jefferson: The Apostle of Americanism, Little, Brown And Company, 595 pages; e'Book, 2nd printing, 1957, 3rd printing, 2011
 Clark, Allen Culling (1905). William Duane, Press of W.F. Roberts Company, 70 pages; e'Book
 Clemons, Harry (1954). The University of Virginia Library, 1825–1950: Story of a Jeffersonian Foundation, University of Virginia Library, 229 pages; Book
 Coles, Edward (1856). History of the Ordinance of 1787, Historical Society of Pennsylvania, 33 pages; e'Book
 Curtis, Christopher Michael (2012). Jefferson's Freeholders and the Politics of Ownership in the Old Dominion, Cambridge University Press, 255 pages; ; Book
 Cunningham, Noble E. (1957). The Jeffersonian Republicans: the formation of party organization, 1789–1801, Volume 2, University of North Carolina Press, 279 pages; Book
 —— (1963). The Jeffersonian Republicans in power: party operations, 1801–1809; University of North Carolina Press Book
 —— (1988). In Pursuit of Reason: The Life of Thomas Jefferson, Random House Publishing Group, Book
 —— (2000). Jefferson Vs. Hamilton: Confrontations that Shaped a Nation, (Biography & Autobiography), Macmillan, 186 pages; Book

 Dabney, Virginius (1981). Mr. Jefferson's University: a history, University Press of Virginia, 642 pages; ; Book
 —— (1981). The Jefferson scandals: a rebuttal, Dodd, Mead, 154 pages; ; Book
 Daugherty, Sonia Medvedeva (1941). Thomas Jefferson: fighter for freedom and human rights, F. Ungar Pub. Co., 352 pages; Book
 Davis, David Brion (1970). Was Thomas Jefferson an Authentic Enemy of Slavery?, Oxford, Clarendon Press, 29 pages; Book
 Dethloff, Henry C. (1971). Thomas Jefferson and American democracy, D. C. Heath, 209 pages; ; Book
 de Witt, Cornélis Henri; Church, R. S. H. (Ed.) (1862). Jefferson and the American Democracy: An Historical Study, Longman, Green, Longman, Roberts, & Green, 448 pages; e'Book
 Dumbauld, Edward (1979). The Bill of rights and what it means today, Greenwood Press, 242 pages; ; Book
 Dungan, Nicholas (2000). Gallatin: America's Swiss Founding Father, New York University Press, 193 pages; ; Book
 Dunlap, John Robertson (1903). Jeffersonian Democracy: Which Means the Democracy of Thomas Jefferson, Andrew Jackson and Abraham Lincoln, Jeffersonian Society, 479 pages; e'Book
 

 Ellis, Richard E. (1971). The Jeffersonian Crisis: Courts and Politics in the Young Republic, Oxford University Press, 392 pages; ; Book
 Elkins, Stanley; McKitrick, Eric (1995). The Age of Federalism: The Early American Republic, 1788–1800, Oxford University Press, 944 pages; ; Book

 Fatovic, Clement; Kleinerman, Benjamin A.  (2004). "Constitutionalism and Presidential Prerogative: Jeffersonian and Hamiltonian Perspectives." : American Journal of Political Science, Book
 
 Ferling, John (2000). Setting the World Ablaze : Washington, Adams, Jefferson, and the American Revolution:, Oxford University Press, 428 pages; ; Book
 —— (2005). Adams vs. Jefferson: The Tumultuous Election of 1800, Oxford University Press, 260 pages; ; Book
 —— (2013). Jefferson and Hamilton: The Rivalry That Forged a Nation, Bloomsbury Publishing USA, 352 pages; ; Book
 Finkelman, Paul (2001). Slavery and the Founders: Race and Liberty in the Age of Jefferson, M.E. Sharpe, 296 pages; ; Book
 Fleming, Thomas J. (2003). The Louisiana Purchase, Wiley Publishers, 186 pages; ; Book
 —— (2015). The Great Divide: The Conflict between Washington and Jefferson that Defined a Nation, Da Capo Press, ; Book
 Foster, Franklin Pierce (1917). The world war, Jefferson and democracy, The History Club, 51 pages; e'Book
 Foote, Henry Wilder (1947). Thomas Jefferson: Social Reformer, Volume 807, Issue 12, Beacon Press, 15 pages; Book
 Fremont-Barnes, Gregory (2006). The Wars of the Barbary Pirates: To the Shores of Tripoli – The Rise of the US Navy and Marines, Osprey Publishing, 95 pages; ; Book
 Frisch, Morton J. (1992). The Hamilton-Madison-Jefferson Triangle, Ashbrook Press, 39 pages; ; Book
 Gabler, James M. (1995). Passions: The Wines and Travels of Thomas Jefferson, Bacchus Press Ltd., 318 pages; ; Book
 Gannon, Kevin M. (2001). Escaping "Mr. Jefferson's Plan of Destruction": New England Federalists and the Idea of a Northern Confederacy, 1803–1804, University of Pennsylvania Press Book
 Gawalt, Gerard W. (2010). Circle of Friends: Thomas Jefferson and His Women Correspondents, CreateSpace Independent Publishing Platform, 279 pages; ; Book
 Geer, Curtis Manning; Lee, Guy Carleton; Thorpe, Francis Newton (1904). The Louisiana purchase and the westward movement, G. Barrie, publisher, 497 pages; e'Book
 Genovese, Eugene; Fox-Genovese, D. Elizabeth (2005). The Mind of the Master Class: History and Faith in the Southern Slaveholders' Worldview, Cambridge University Press, 828 pages; ; Book
 Giles, William Branch; Anderson, Dice Robins (1914). William Branch Giles: A Study in the Politics of Virginia and the Nation from 1790 to 1830, George Banta Publishing Company, 271 pages; e'Book
 Gilreath, James (1999). Thomas Jefferson and the Education of a Citizen, Library of Congress, 383 pages; ; Book
 Gilpatrick, Delbert Harold (1931). Jeffersonian Democracy in North Carolina: 1789–1816, Columbia University Press, 257 pages; Book
 Golden, James L.; Golden, Alan L. (2002). Thomas Jefferson and the Rhetoric of Virtue, Rowman & Littlefield, 522 pages; ; Book
 Gutzman, Kevin R.C. (2007). Virginia's American Revolution: From Dominion to Republic, 1776–1840, Lexington Books, 235 pages; ; Book
 Hailman, John R. (2006). Thomas Jefferson on Wine, Univ. Press of Mississippi, 457 pages; ; Book
 Holowchak, M. Andrew (2013). Thomas Jefferson and Philosophy: Essays on the Philosophical Cast of Jefferson's Writings, Lexington Books, 220 pages; ; Book
 Hammond, John Craig (2007). Slavery, Freedom, and Expansion in the Early American West, University of Virginia Press, 245 pages; ; Book
 Hanson, Stephen D. (2010). Transcending Time with Thomas Jefferson: Is the Constitution Still Applicable Today?, iUniverse, 268 pages; ; Book
 Harris, Matthew L.; Buckley, Jay H. (2012). Zebulon Pike, Thomas Jefferson, and the Opening of the American West, University of Oklahoma Press, 256 pages; ; Book
 Hart, Albert Bushnell (1893). Formation of the Union, 1750–1829, Longmans, Green, 278 pages; e'Book1, e'Book2
  —— (1906) & numerous authors The American Nation: The Jeffersonian system, 1801–1811, by E. Channing, Harper & Brothers, New York, London, 299 pages; e'Book
 Hatch, Peter J. (1992). The Gardens of Thomas Jefferson's Monticello, Thomas Jefferson Memorial Foundation, 56 pages; ; Book
 Hatzenbuehler, Ronald L. (2007). "I Tremble for My Country": Thomas Jefferson and the Virginia Gentry, University Press of Florida; 206 pages; 
 Hellenbrand, Harold (1980). The Unfinished Revolution: Education and Politics in the Thought of Thomas Jefferson,  Associated University Press, 207 pages;  ; Book
 Helo, Ari (2014). Thomas Jefferson's Ethics and the Politics of Human Progress: The Morality of a Slaveholder, Cambridge University Press, 296 pages; ; Book
 Hildreth, Richard (1856). John Adams and Jefferson, Harper & Brothers, New York, 579 pages; e'Book
 Historical Society of Pennsylvania (1901). Inauguration of President Thomas Jefferson, The Pennsylvania Magazine of History and Biography (pp. 71–76), e'Book1, e'Book2
 Hitchens, Christopher (2005). Author of America: Thomas Jefferson, HarperCollins, 208 pages; Book
 —— (2007). Jefferson Versus the Muslim Pirates, CITY Journal, The Manhattan Institute, Magazine, Essay
 Honeywell, Roy J. (1931). The Educational Work of Thomas Jefferson, Harvard University Press, 295 pages; e'Book
 Horn, James P.P.; Jan Ellen Lewis and Peter S. Onuf, eds. (2002). The Revolution of 1800: Democracy, Race, and the New Republic  17 essays by scholars
 Hotchner, A.E. (1996). Louisiana Purchase, Carroll & Graf Publishers, 383 pages; ; Book
 Houston, Frank K. (2010). Historic Monticello: Home of Thomas Jefferson, Charlottesville, Virginia, Albertype – Monticello (Va.); 50 pages; Book
 Howard, Hugh (2011). Dr. Kimball and Mr. Jefferson: Rediscovering the Founding Fathers of American Architecture, Bloomsbury Publishing USA, 320 pages; ; Book
 Hubbard, Elbert; Lentz, John Jacob (1906). Thomas Jefferson: A Little Journey, Roycrofters, 105 pages; e'Book
 Jackson, Donald Dean (1989). A Year at Monticello, 1795, Fulcrum, 117 pages; Book
 ——  (1993). Thomas Jefferson & the Stony Mountains: Exploring the West from Monticello, University of Oklahoma Press, 339 pages; ; Book
 Johnstone, Robert Jr. (1978). Jefferson and the Presidency: Leadership in the Young Republic, Ithaca: Cornell University Press, 332 pages; ; Book
 Kaminski, John P. (2005). Thomas Jefferson: Philosopher and Politician, UW-Madison Libraries Parallel Press, 95 pages; ; Book
 Kaplan, Lawrence S. (1980). Jefferson and France: an essay on politics and political ideas, Greenwood Press, 175 pages; Book
 Kennedy, Roger G. (2003). Mr. Jefferson's Lost Cause: Land, Farmers, Slavery, and the Louisiana Purchase, Oxford University Press, 376 pages; Book
 Kilmeade, Brian; Yaeger, Don (2015). Thomas Jefferson and the Tripoli Pirates: The Forgotten War That Changed American History, Penguin Press,  Book
 Kimball, Fiske (1968). Thomas Jefferson: Architect, Library Reprints, Incorporated, 205 pages; ; Book
 ——  (1949). Jefferson and the Public Buildings of Virginia, Williamsburg (Va.), 6 pages; Book
 Kimball, Marie (2007). Jefferson – War and Peace 1776 to 1784, Read Books, 424 pages; ; Book
 Kitzen, Michael L.S. (1993). Tripoli and the United States at war: a history of American relations with the Barbary states, 1785–1805, McFarland, 203 pages; ; Book
 Koch, Adrienne (2008). Jefferson and Madison – The Great Collaboration, Read Books, 328 pages; ; Book
 ——  (1957). The Philosophy of Thomas Jefferson, Peter Smith, publisher, 208 pages; Book
 Knudson, Jerry W. (2006). Jefferson and the Press: Crucible of Liberty, University of South Carolina Press, 221 pages; ; Book
 Lacey, Michael James; Haakonssen, Knud (1992). A Culture of Rights: The Bill of Rights in Philosophy, Politics and Law 1791 and 1991, Cambridge University Press, 474 pages; ; Book
 Lambeth, William; Manning, Warren (2009). Thomas Jefferson as an Architect and a Designer of Landscapes, Applewood Books, 188 pages; ; Book
 Ledgin, Norm (2000). Diagnosing Jefferson, Future Horizons, 254 pages; ; Book
 Lehmann, Karl; Malone, Dumas (1985). Thomas Jefferson, American Humanist, University of Virginia Press, 273 pages; ; Book
 Leiner, Frederick C.  (2000). Millions for defense: the subscription warships of 1798, Naval Institute Press, 262 pages; Book
 Lerner, Max (2013). Thomas Jefferson: America's Philosopher-King, Transaction Publishers, 147 pages; ; Book
 Levinson, Sanford; Sparrow, Bartholomew (2005). The Louisiana Purchase and American Expansion, 1803–1898, Rowman & Littlefield Publishers, 272 pages; ; Book
 Levy, Leonard Williams (1963). Jefferson & civil liberties: the darker side, Belknap Press of Harvard University Press, 225 pages; Book
 Levy, Robert (2007). The First Emancipator: Slavery, Religion, and the Quiet Revolution of Robert Cater, Random House, 360 pages; ; Book
 Lewis, Jan; Onuf, Peter S. (1999). Sally Hemings & Thomas Jefferson: History, Memory, and Civic Culture, University of Virginia Press, 280 pages; ; Book
 Long, Orie William (1933). Thomas Jefferson and George Ticknor: A Chapter in American Scholarship, McClelland Press, 39 pages; Book

 Malone, Dumas (1963). Thomas Jefferson as Political Leader, University of California Press, 75 pages; Book
 Massner, Franziska (2008). Thomas Jefferson and Slavery, GRIN Verlag, 28 pages; ; Book
 Matthews, Richard K. (1984). The Radical Political Philosophy of Thomas Jefferson, University Press of Kansas, 171 pages; ; Book
 Mayer, David N. (1988). The Constitutional Thought of Thomas Jefferson (Constitutionalism and Democracy)University of Virginia Press, 1448 pages; ; Book
 McColley, Robert (1964). Slavery and Jeffersonian Virginia, University of Illinois Press, 227 pages; Book
 McCoy, Drew R. (1996). The Elusive Republic: Political Economy in Jeffersonian America, University of North Carolina Press, 268 pages; ; Book
 McDonald, Forrest (1987). The Presidency of Thomas Jefferson  intellectual history approach to Jefferson's presidency, University Press of Kansas, 216 pages; ; Book
 McDonald, Robert M. S. (2004). Thomas Jefferson's Military Academy: Founding West Point. Jeffersonian America University of Virginia Press, 233 pages; ; Book
 —— (2012). Light and Liberty: Thomas Jefferson and the Power of Knowledge, University of Virginia Press, 232 pages; ; Book
 McDowell, Gary L.; Noble, Sharon L. (1997). Reason and Republicanism: Thomas Jefferson's Legacy of Liberty, Rowman & Littlefield, 325 pages; ; Book
 McLean, Iain (2004). "Thomas Jefferson, John Adams, and the Déclaration des Droits de l'Homme et du Citoyen" in McLean, The future of liberal democracy: Thomas Jefferson and the contemporary world, Palgrave Macmillan,  online, Book
 McMurry, Rebecca L.; McMurry, James F. (2002). Anatomy of a scandal: Thomas Jefferson & the Sally story, White Mane Books, 204 pages; ; Book
 Merwin, Henry Childs (1899). Aaron Burr, Small, Maynard, Boston, 150 pages; e'Book1, e'Book2
 Miller, John Chester (1963). The Federalist Era: 1789–1801, Harper & Row, 304 pages; ; Book
 —— (1980). The Wolf by the Ears: Thomas Jefferson and Slavery New American Library, 123 pages; |; Book
 Miller, Robert (2006). Native America, Discovered and Conquered: : Thomas Jefferson, Lewis & Clark, and Manifest Destiny, Greenwood Publishing Group, ; Book
  Mooy, Kees de (2003). The Wisdom of Thomas Jefferson, Citadel Publishers, 224 pages; ; Book
 Mott, Frank Luther (1943). Jefferson and the Press, Louisiana State University Press, 65 pages; Book
 Murrin, John M. (2000). The Jeffersonian Triumph and American Exceptionalism, University of Pennsylvania Press, Academic Journal

  Nash, Gary; Russell, Graham; Hodges, Gao (2012). Friends of Liberty: Thomas Jefferson, Tadeusz Kosciuszko, and Agrippa Hull, Basic Books, 328 pages; ; Book
 Nester, William (2013). The Jeffersonian vision, 1801–1815: The Art of American Power During the Early Republic, Potomac Books, Inc, 294 pages Book
 Newbold, Stephanie P. (2010). All But Forgotten: Thomas Jefferson and the Development of Public Administration, SUNY Press, 147 pages; ; Book
 Nicolay, John George; Stockton, Frank Richard (1887). Thomas Jefferson's Home, Century Company, 658 pages; e'Book
 Norton, Wilbur Theodore (1911). Edward Coles: Second Governor of Illinois. 1786–1868, Washington Square Press, 30 pages; e'Book

 O'Brien, Conor Cruise (1996). The Long Affair: Thomas Jefferson and the French Revolution, 1785–1800, University of Chicago Press, 367 pages; ; Book
 Onuf, Peter S. (1993). Jeffersonian Legacies, University of Virginia Press, 478 pages; ; Book
 —— (1999). Thomas Jefferson: An Anthology, Wiley, 272 pages; ; Book
  —— (2000). "Every Generation Is An Nation': Colonization, Miscegenation and the Fate of Jefferson's Children", William and Mary Quarterly, Vol. LVII, No.1, January 2000, JSTOR;
 ——  (2001). Jefferson's Empire: The Languages of American Nationhood, University of Virginia Press, 250 pages; ; Book
 Padover, Saul K. (1965). Thomas Jefferson and the Foundations of American Freedom, Fawcett Publications, 192 pages; Book
 ——  (1946). Thomas Jefferson and The National Capital, U.S. Government Printing Office, 522 pages; e'Book
 Pancake, John S. (1974). Thomas Jefferson & Alexander Hamilton, Barron's Educational Series, 521 pages; Book
 Perry, Barbara A. (2006). "Jefferson's Legacy to the Supreme Court: Freedom of Religion", Journal of Supreme Court History: pp. 181–98.  Fulltext in Swetswise, Ingenta and Ebsco
 Peterson, Merrill D. (1963). Jefferson's 'Consent of the Governed': Convolutions of a Doctrine, Thomas Jefferson Memorial Foundation, 17 pages; Book
 ——  (1975). Thomas Jefferson and the Enlightenment: reflections on literary influence, Westminster Publications, 39 pages; Book
 ——  (1984). Thomas Jefferson, the Founders, and Constitutional Change, Claremont Institute for the Study of Statesmanship and Political Philosophy, 20 pages; ; Book
 Philips, Kim Tousley (1989). William Duane, radical journalist in the age of Jefferson, Garland Pubublishers, 679 pages, ; Book
 Poffenberger, Brien J. (1991). Jefferson's Design of the Capitol of Virginia, University of Virginia, 230 pages; Book
 Presidential Library (2010). The Wisdom of Thomas Jefferson, Open Road Media, 251 pages; ; Book
 Ragosta, John (2013). Religious Freedom: Jefferson's Legacy, America's Creed, University of Virginia Press, 312 pages; ; Book
 Rahe, Paul A. (1995). "Thomas Jefferson's Machiavellian Political Science". Review of Politics  57(3): 449–481.  Fulltext online at Jstor and Ebsco.
 Rakove, Jack (2010). Revolutionaries: A New History of the Invention of America, Houghton Mifflin Harcourt, 496 pages; ; Book
  Rayner, B.L. (1832). Sketches of the life, writings, and opinions of Thomas Jefferson, A. Francis and W. Boardman, 556 pages; E'book
 ——  (1834). Life of Thomas Jefferson, Lilly, Wait, Colman, & Holden, Boston, 431 pages; E'book1, E'book2
 Read, James H. (2000). Power Versus Liberty: Madison, Hamilton, Wilson, and Jefferson, University of Virginia Press, 201 pages; ; Book
 Reed, Helen Scott Townsend (1991). Jefferson's Observation Tower Projects for Montalto and the University of Virginia, University of Virginia, 140 pages; Book
 Richards, Leonard L. (2000). The Slave Power: The Free North and Southern Domination, 1780–1860, LSU Press, 228 pages; ; Book
 Risjord, Norman K. (1994). Thomas Jefferson, Rowman & Littlefield, 210 pages; ; Book
 
 Rist, Boyd Clifton (1985). The Jeffersonian crisis revived: Virginia, the court, and the appellate jurisdiction controversy, University of Virginia, 634 pages; Book
 Robinson, William A.  (2008). Jeffersonian Democracy in New England, Read Books, 196 pages; ; Book
 Rogow, Arnold (1999). A Fatal Friendship: Alexander Hamilton and Aaron Burr, Macmillan, 368 pages; ; Book
 Root, Erik S. (2008). All Honor to Jefferson?: The Virginia Slavery Debates and the Positive Good Thesis, exington Books, 255 pages; ; Book
 Rutland, Robert Allen (1975). Madison's Alternatives: The Jeffersonian Republicans and the Coming of War, 1805–1812, Lippincott, 152 pages; ; Book
 Sargent, Lyman Tower (ed.) (1997). Political Thought in the United States: A Documentary History, New York University Press, 428 pages; ; Book
 Schwarz, Philip J. (2010). Slave Laws in Virginia, University of Georgia Press, 272 pages; ; Book
 Sears, Louis Martin (1927). Jefferson and the Embargo, Duke University Press, 338 pages; Book
 Seefeldt, Douglas; Hantman, Jeffrey L.; Onuf, Peter S. (2006). Across the Continent: Jefferson, Lewis and Clark, and the Making of America, University of Virginia Press, 222 pages; ; Book
 Selby, John E. (2007). The Revolution in Virginia, 1775–1783, Colonial Williamsburg, 442 pages; ; Book
 Shannon, Joseph B. (1931). Thomas Jefferson, the Advocate of Truth, Freedom and Equality, C. S. Demaree Stationery Company, 31 pages; Book
 Sharp, James Roger (1993). American Politics in the Early Republic: The New Nation in Crisis, Yale University Press, 365 pages; ; Book
 ——  (2010). The Deadlocked Election of 1800: Jefferson, Burr, and the Union in the Balance, University of Kansas Publications, 239 pages; ; Book
 Schouler, James (1893). Thomas Jefferson, Dodd, Mead and Company, New York, 261 pages; e'Book
 Sheehan, Bernard W.  (1974). Seeds of Extinction: Jeffersonian Philanthropy and the American Indian, W. W. Norton & Company, 301 pages; ; Book
 Sheldon, Garrett Ward (1991). The political philosophy of Thomas Jefferson, Johns Hopkins University Press, 174 pages; ; Book
 Simon, James F. (2003). What Kind of Nation: Thomas Jefferson, John Marshall, and the Epic Struggle to Create a United States, Simon and Schuster, 352 pages; Book
 Sisson, Dan (1974). The American Revolution of 1800, Knopf Publishers, New York, 468 pages; ; Book
 Sloan, Herbert J. (2001). Principle and Interest: Thomas Jefferson and the Problem of Debt, University of Virginia Press, 377 pages; ; Book
 Smelser, Marshall (1968). The Democratic Republic: 1801–1815 "New American Nation", Harper & Row, 369 pages (survey of political and diplomatic history), Book
 Smith, Gene Allen (1991). The Ruinous Folly of a Navy: A History of the Jeffersonian Gunboat Program, G.A. Smith (self publish), 280 pages; Book
 Smyth, Clifford (1866). Thomas Jefferson, the father of American democracy, Funk & Wagnalls Co., New York, London, Book1, Book2
 Spahn, Hannah (2011). Thomas Jefferson, Time, and History, University of Virginia Press, 290 pages; ; Book
 Staloff, Darren (2005). Hamilton, Adams, Jefferson: The Politics of Enlightenment and the American Founding.
 Stanton, Lucia C. (2012). Those Who Labor for My Happiness: Slavery at Thomas Jefferson's Monticello, University of Virginia Press, 384 pages; ; Book
 Steele, Brian (2012). Thomas Jefferson and American Nationhood, Cambridge University Press, 321 pages; ; Book
 Stevens, John Austin (1884). Albert Gallatin, Volume 13, Houghton, Mifflin, 419 pages; E'book
 —— ; Gillett, Pond, Nathan; Lamb, Martha Joanna (1890). The Magazine of American History with Notes and Queries, A.S. Barnes, New York, 523 pages; E'book
 Stewart, David O. (2012). American Emperor: Aaron Burr's Challenge to Jefferson's America, Simon and Schuster, 432 pages; ; Book
 Stewart, John J. (1997). Thomas Jefferson: Forerunner to the Restoration, Cedar Fort, 96 pages; ; Book
  Stuart, Reginald C. (1978). The Half-way Pacifist: Thomas Jefferson's View of War, University of Toronto Press, 93 pages; ; Book
 Tator, Henry H. (1852). An Oration Commemorative of the Character of Thomas Jefferson, Joel Munsell (publisher), 22 pages; E'book
 Thomas Jefferson Heritage Society (2001). The Jefferson-Hemings myth: an American travesty, Jefferson Editions, 207 pages; ; Book
 Tippen, Mary B. (1991). Thomas Jefferson: inconsistent values, University of Michigan-Flint, 152 pages; Book
 Tucker, Robert W.; Hendrickson, David C. (1990). Empire of Liberty: The Statecraft of Thomas Jefferson, Oxford University Press, 384 pages; ; Book
 Tucker, Spencer (1993). The Jeffersonian Gunboat Navy, University of South Carolina Press, 265 pages; ; Book
 Urofsky, Melvin I. (2001). The Levy Family and Monticello, 1834–1923: Saving Thomas Jefferson's House, Thomas Jefferson Foundation, 256 pages; ; Book
 —— ; Urofsky, Melvin I. (2006). Thomas Jefferson and John Marshall: "What Kind of Constitution Shall We Have?" Journal of Supreme Court History  31(2): 109–125.  Fulltext: in Swetswise, Ingenta and Ebsco
 Valsania, Maurizio (2004). Our Original Barbarism': Man Vs. Nature in Thomas Jefferson's Moral Experience, Journal of the History of Ideas,  Fulltext: in Project Muse and Swetswise
 ——  (2013). Nature's Man: Thomas Jefferson's Philosophical Anthropology, University of Virginia Press, 204 pages; Book
 ——  (2011). The Limits of Optimism: Thomas Jefferson's Dualistic Enlightenment , University of Virginia Press, 224 pages; ; Book
 Wagoner, Jennings L., Jr. (2004). Jefferson and Education.
 Wallace, Anthony F.C. (2009). Jefferson and the Indians: The Tragic Fate of the First Americans, Harvard University Press, 416 pages; ; Book
 Wallace, D.D. (1911). Jefferson's Part in the Purchase of Louisiana, The Sewanee Review, E'book
 Wayland, John Walter (1907). The political opinions of Thomas Jefferson: an essay, The Neale Publishing Company, 98 pages; E'book1, E'book2
 Wheelan, Joseph (2004). Jefferson's War: America's First War on Terror 1801–1805.
 ——  (2005). Jefferson's Vendetta. Carrol and Graf Publishers, New York
 Whipple, Addison Beecher Colvin (2001). To the Shores of Tripoli: The Birth of the U.S. Navy and Marines,, Naval Institute Press, 357 pages; ; Book
 Wiggins, James Russell (1959). Jefferson Through the Fog: An Address Delivered at Monticello, April 13, 1959, Thomas Jefferson Memorial Foundation, 17 pages; Book
 White, Leonard Dupee (1948). The Federalists, Macmillan Company, 538 pages; Book
 Wilentz, Sean (2006). The Rise of American Democracy: Jefferson to Lincoln, W. W. Norton & Company, 1044 pages; ; Book
 Williams, John Sharp (1913). Thomas Jefferson. His Permanent Influence on American Institutions, Columbia University Press, New York, 330 pages; E'book1, E'book2
 Wills, Garry (2005). Negro President: Jefferson and the Slave Power, Houghton Mifflin Harcourt, 274 pages;  Book
 ——  (2007). Henry Adams and the Making of America, Houghton Mifflin Harcourt, 467 pages; ; Book
 ——  (2007). Mr. Jefferson's University, National Geographic Books, 162 pages; ; Book
 Wilson, Douglas L.; Stanton, Lucia C. (1999). Jefferson Abroad, Modern Library, 338 pages; ; Book
 Winik, Jay (2007). The Great Upheaval Harper-Collins Publishers, New York; 661 pages; ;   Book
 Wise, James Waterman (1943). Thomas Jefferson then and now, 1743–1943: a national symposium, Bill of Rights Sesqui-centennial Committee, 143 pages; Book
 Wolfe, John Harold (1940). Jeffersonian Democracy in South Carolina, The University of North Carolina press, 308 pages; Book
 Wood, Gordon S. (1998). The Creation of the American Republic: 1776–1787, University of North Carolina Press, 653 pages; ; Book
  ——  (2006). Revolutionary Characters: What Made the Founders Different, Penguin, 321 pages; ; Book
 ——  (2009). Empire of Liberty: A History of the Early Republic, 1789–1815, Oxford University Press, 800 pages, Book
 Wright, Robert E. (2008). One Nation Under Debt : Hamilton, Jefferson, and the History of What We Owe, McGraw Hill Professional, 419 pages; ;  Book
 Zacks, Richard (2005). The Pirate Coast: Thomas Jefferson, the First Marines, and the Secret Mission of 1805, Hyperion, New York, 432 pages, ; Book

Religion
 Adamson, Barry (2008). Freedom of Religion, the First Amendment, and the Supreme Court, Pelican Publishing, 422 pages; ;   Book
 Beliles, Mark; Newcombe, Jerry (2014) Doubting Thomas: The Religious Life and Legacy of Thomas Jefferson, Morgan James Publishing, 520 pages; Book
 Blanshard, Paul (1963). Religion and the schools: the great controversy, Beacon Press, 265 pages; Book
 Braden, Bruce (2008). Ye Will Say I Am No Christian: The Thomas Jefferson/John Adams Correspondence on Religion, Morals, and Values, Prometheus Books, 257 pages; ;   Book
 Dreisbach, Daniel L. (2002). Thomas Jefferson and the Wall of Separation between Church and State, online
 Eidsmoe, John (1995). Christianity and the Constitution: The Faith of Our Founding Fathers, Baker Publishing Group, 480 pages; ;   Book
 Foote, Henry Wilder (1947). Thomas Jefferson: Champion of Religious Freedom : Advocate of Christian Morale, Beacon Press, 70 pages; Book
 ——   (1960). The Religion of Thomas Jefferson, Beacon Press, 86 pages;   Book
 Gaustad, Edwin S. (2001). Sworn on the Altar of God: A Religious Biography of Thomas Jefferson, Book1 Book 1; Book2 Book 2
 Hall, J. Lesslie (1913). The Religious Opinions of Thomas Jefferson,  The Sewanee Review, 13 pages; E'book
 Hall, Timothy; Hall, Timothy L. (1998). Separating Church and State, University of Illinois Press, 206 pages; ;   Book
 Hamburger, Philip (2009). Separation of Church and State, Harvard University Press, 528 pages; ;   Book
 Healey, Robert M. (1970). Jefferson on Religion in Public Education, Archon Books, 294 pages; ;   Book
 Irons, Charles F. (2009). Origins of Proslavery Christianity, Univ of North Carolina Press, 384 pages; ; Book
 Jackson, Henry E., Ed., (1923). The Thomas Jefferson Bible,
 Lambert, Frank (2003). The Founding Fathers and the Place of Religion in America, Princeton University, 328 pages; ;   Book
 Meyerson, Michael I. (2012). Endowed by Our Creator: The Birth of Religious Freedom in America, Yale University Press, 320 pages; ;   Book
 Muñoz, Vincent Phillip (2009). God and the Founders: Madison, Washington, and Jefferson, Cambridge University Press, 242 pages; ;  Book
 Peach, John Harding (2012). Thomas Jefferson: Roots of Religious Freedom, CrossBooks, 364 pages; ;   Book
 Peterson, Merrill D.; Vaughan, Robert C. (2003). The Virginia Statute for Religious Freedom: Its Evolution and Consequences in American History, Cambridge University Press, 392 pages; ; Book
 Sanford, Charles B. The Religious Life of Thomas Jefferson (1987) University of Virginia Press, Book
 Sheldon, Garrett Ward; Dreisbach, Daniel L. (2000). Religion and political culture in Jefferson's Virginia, Rowman & Littlefield, 236 pages; ;  Book
 Sheridan, Eugene R. (2001). Jefferson and Religion, preface by Martin Marty, University of North Carolina Press, ;  Book
 Vicchio, Stephen J. (2007) Jefferson's Religion, Wipf and Stock Publishers, 158 pages; ;   Book
 West, Ellis M. (2012). The Religion Clauses of the First Amendment, Lexington Books, 250 pages; ;  Book
 Witte, John (2000). Religion and the American Constitutional Experiment: Essential Rights and Liberties, Westview Press, 379 pages; ;  Book

Legacy and historiography
 , Book
 Cogliano, Francis D. (ed.) (2012). A Companion to Thomas Jefferson, 648 pp; 34 essays by scholars focusing on how historians have handled Jefferson. online
  Gordon-Reed, Annette. Thomas Jefferson and Sally Hemings: An American controversy, Charlottesville, Virginia: University of Virginia Press, 1997 (reprint 1998 to include discussion of DNA analysis) Book
 Gilreath, Thomas; Gilreath, James; Wilson, Douglas L. (2010). Thomas Jefferson's Library, The Lawbook Exchange, Ltd., 162 pages; ; Book
 Onuf, Peter (October 1993). "The Scholars' Jefferson," William and Mary Quarterly 3d Series, L:4, 671–699. Historiographical review or scholarship about TJ; in JSTOR
 —— ed.  (1993). Jeffersonian Legacies, University of Virginia Press, 478 pages; Book
 Peter S., ed. (with Jan Ellen Lewis) (1999). Sally Hemings and Thomas Jefferson: History, Memory, and Civic Culture, University Press of Virginia Google preview.
 Perry, Barbara A. "Jefferson's Legacy to the Supreme Court: Freedom of Religion", Journal of Supreme Court History 2006 31(2): 181–198. 
  Book; Bancroft Prize
 Taylor, Jeff (2006). Where Did the Party Go?: William Jennings Bryan, Hubert Humphrey, and the Jeffersonian Legacy, University of Missouri Press, 373 pages; ; Book
 Wilson, Douglas L. (1992). Thomas Jefferson and the Character Issue, The Atlantic Monthly, Article
 Wiltse, Charles Maurice (1935). The Jeffersonian Tradition in American Democracy, University of North Carolina Press, 273 pages; Book
 "Thomas Jefferson", PBS interviews with 24 historians

Primary sources
 Jefferson, Thomas; Randolph, J. W. (Ed.) (1853). Notes on the State of Virginia, E'book1, E'book2
 —— (1953). Thomas Jefferson's Farm Book: With Commentary and Relevant Extracts from Other Writings, American Philosophical Society, 552 pages; Book,  Search contents at Massachusetts Historical Society
 —— (1802). Jefferson's Letter to the Danbury Baptists (Separation of Church and State), The Draft and Recently Discovered Text, Library of Congress, LOC listing
 —— (2004). Quotes by Thomas Jefferson, Applewood Books, 32 pages; ; Book
 —— (2011). Jefferson on Freedom: Wisdom, Advice, and Hints on Freedom, Democracy, and the American Way, Skyhorse Publishing Company, 139 pages; ; Book
 ——; The Life and Morals of Jesus of Nazareth, Government Printing Office, Washington DC, E'book1, E'book2
 —— (1900).  The Jefferson Cyclopedia, large collection of TJ quotations arranged by 9000 topics; searchable; online E'book
 ——; The Thomas Jefferson Papers, 1606–1827, 27,000 original manuscript documents at the Library of Congress online collection
 —— (1809). Memoirs of the Hon. Thomas Jefferson, Secretary of State, Vice-President, and President of the United States of America, 404 pages; New York, E'book
 —— (2011). Jefferson on Freedom: Wisdom, Advice, and Hints on Freedom, Democracy, and the American Way, Skyhorse Publishing Company, Incorporated, 139 pages; ; Book
 —— (1851). An essay towards facilitating instruction in the Anglo-Saxon and modern dialects of the English language, for the use of the University of Virginia, 51 pages; E'book

Edited primary sources
 ——; Appleby, Joyce; Hall, Terence Ball; (eds.) (1999). Thomas Jefferson, Political Writings, Cambridge University Press, 623 pages; ; Book
 ——; Baron, Robert C. (ed.) (1987). The garden and farm books of Thomas Jefferson, Fulcrum Publishing, 528 pages; ; Book
 ——; Bregh, Albert Ellery (1903). The Writings of Thomas Jefferson Vol II, The Thomas Jefferson Memorial Association, Washington, 450 pages; E'book
 ——; —— (1903). The Writings of Thomas Jefferson Vol X, The Thomas Jefferson Memorial Association, Washington, 448 pages; E'book
 ——; —— (1903). The Writings of Thomas Jefferson Vol XII, The Thomas Jefferson Memorial Association, Washington, 441 pages; E'book
 ——; —— (1904).  The writings of Thomas Jefferson, Volume: 15–16, Thomas Jefferson Memorial Association, 472 pages; E'book
 ——; —— (1905). The Writings of Thomas Jefferson 19 vol., Thomas Jefferson Memorial Association, E'book
 ——; Betts, Edwin Morris (ed.), Thomas Jefferson's Farm Book, (Thomas Jefferson Memorial: December 1, 1953) .
 ——; Boyd, Julian P. et al., (eds.) The Papers of Thomas Jefferson. (1950–2012, in process) The definitive multi-volume edition; available at major academic libraries. 38 volumes covers TJ to Nov. 1802.
 ——; Brandt, Anthony (2007). Thomas Jefferson Travels: Selected Writings, 1784–1789, National Geographic Books, 388 pages; ; Book
 ——; Butterfield, Lyman Henry; Cullen, Charles T. (2008). The Papers of Thomas Jefferson: 1 May to July 31, 1801, Princeton University Press, 767 pages; ; Book
 —— ; Cabell, Nathaniel Francis; Cabell, Joseph Carrington (1856). Early history of the University of Virginia, J. W. Randolph, publisher, 528 pages; E'book
 ——; ——; ——; John Catanzariti (2012). The Papers of Thomas Jefferson: July 1 to November 12, 1802, Princeton University Press, 755 pages; ; Book
 ——; Cappon, Lester J., (ed.) (1959). The Adams-Jefferson Letters, University of North Carolina Press, Book
 ——; Catchings, Benjamin S. (1907). Master Thoughts of Thomas Jefferson, Nation Press, 196 pages; E'book1, E'book2
 ——; Chinard, Gilbert (ed.) (1926).  The Commonplace Book of Thomas Jefferson: A Repertory of His Ideas on Government, The Johns Hopkins Press, 403 pages; Book
 ——; Dwight, Theodore Dwight (1839).  The character of Thomas Jefferson: as exhibited in his own writings, Weeks, Jordan & Company, 371 pages E'book
 ——; Foley, John P. (ed.) (1900). The Jeffersonian Cyclopedia: A Comprehensive Collection of the Views of Thomas Jefferson ..., Funk and Wangalls Company, 1009 pages; E'book

 ——; Ford, Paul Leicester (1892). The Writings of Thomas Jefferson: 1760–1775, Vol. I, G.P. Putnam's Sons, Knickerbocker Press, New York, London, 498 pages; E'book
  ——; —— (1892). The Writings of Thomas Jefferson: 1760–1775, Vol. II, G.P. Putnam's Sons, Knickerbocker Press, New York, London, 517 pages; E'book
 ——; ——; (1894). The Writings of Thomas Jefferson: 1760–1775, Vol. III, G.P. Putnam's Sons, Knickerbocker Press, New York, London, 444 pages; E'book1, E'book2
 ——; —— (1895). The Writings of Thomas Jefferson: 1760–1775, Vol. V, G.P. Putnam's Sons, Knickerbocker Press, New York, London, 517 pages; E'book, E'book
 ——; Hammond George; United States. Dept. of State, (1794). Authentic Copies of the Correspondence of Thomas Jefferson, Esq., Secretary of State to the United States of America, and George Hammond, Esq., Minister Plenipotentiary of Great-Britain, Reprinted for Debrett, Great Britain, 89 pages; E'book
 Hunt, Gaberial John (1996). The essential Thomas Jefferson, Random House Value Publishing, 334 pages; Book
 ——; Jenkins, Charles Francis (1906). Jefferson's Germantown Letters: Together with Other Papers Relating to His Stay in Germantown During the Month of November 1793 W.J. Campbell, 202 pages; E'book1, E'book2
 Jefferson, Isaac; Campbell, Charles (1951). Memoirs of a Monticello slave, University of Virginia Press, 45 pages; Book, E'book
 ——; Koch, Adrienne (ed.) (1944/1993). The Life and Selected Writings of Thomas Jefferson, Random House, 691 pages; ; E'book
 ——; Larson, Martin Alfred (1977). The essence of Jefferson, J. Binns Publishing, 270 pages; ; Book
 ——; Lewis, Meriwether; Clark, William, Silbey, John (2004). Jefferson's western explorations, Arthur H. Clark Co., 336 pages; ; Book
 Lipscomb, Andrew (1905). The writings of Thomas Jefferson, Thomas Jefferson memorial association, Washington, D.C., E'book
 ——; Looney, J. Jefferson (2005–2017, current) The Papers of Thomas Jefferson: Retirement Papers. Available at major academic libraries, 10 volumes, covers Jefferson's life following his retirement from public life until his death.
 ——; Hilliard, William; Cometti, Elizabeth (1950). Jefferson's Ideas on a University Library: Letters from the Founder of the University of Virginia to a Boston Bookseller,  Tracy W. McGregor Library, University of Virginia, Charlottesville, 52 pages; E'book
 ——; Howell, Wilbur Samuel (ed.) (1988). Jefferson's Parliamentary Writings. Jefferson's Manual of Parliamentary Practice, written when he was vice-President, with other relevant papers
 Melton, Buckner F. (2004). The Quotable Founding Fathers, Potomac Books, Washington D.C.
 ——; Kaminski, John P. (2006).  The quotable Jefferson, Princeton University Press, 557 pages; ; Book
 —— (1832). The Virginia and Kentucky Resolutions of 1798 and '99; with Jefferson's original draught thereof Also, Madison's report, Calhoun's address, resolutions of the several states in relation to state rights. With other documents in support of the Jeffersonian doctrines of '98, Washington, 82 pages, E'book
 —— A MANUAL OF PARLIAMENTARY PRACTICE:, for the Use of the Senate of the United States, Text, Hogan and Thompson, Philadelphia, 203 pages; E'book
 Moore, Justus E. (1844). The Warning of Thomas Jefferson, Or, A Brief Exposition of the Dangers to be Apprehended to Our Civil and Religious Liberties, from Presbyterianism, Wm. J. Cunningham, 35 pages; E'book
 ——; Parker, William B.; Jonas, Viles (1908). Letters and Addresses, The Sundial Classics Company, New York, 323 pages, E'book1, E'book2
 ——; Paine, Thomas (1988). Paine and Jefferson on Liberty, Continuum Publishing Company, New York, 160 pages; ; Book
 
 ——; Poppin, Richard S. (ed.) (1904). The Declaration of Independence and Letters, Saint Louis, 165 pages; E.book
 ——; T.J. Randolph (1829). Memoirs, correspondence and private papers of Thomas Jefferson, Vol. 1, Ibotson and Palmer, London, 496 pages; E'book
 ——; T.J. Randolph (1830). Memoirs, correspondence and private papers of Thomas Jefferson, Vol. 2, Gray and Bowen, Boston, E'book
 ——; T.J. Randolph (1829). Memoirs, correspondence and private papers of Thomas Jefferson, Vol. 3, Henry Colburn and Richard Bently, London, 560 pages; E'book
 ——; T.J. Randolph (1830). Memoirs, correspondence and private papers of Thomas Jefferson, Vol. 4, Gray and Bowen, Boston, E'book
 Randolph, Sarah N. (1871 – reprint: 2001). The Domestic Life of Thomas Jefferson, Digital Scanning Inc, 441 pages; ; E'book1, E'book2
 ——; Sawvel, Franklin, B., PhD (1903). The Complete Anas of Thomas Jefferson, Round Table Press, 283 pages; E'book1, E'book2
 ——; Sellers, Horace W. (1904). Letters of Thomas Jefferson to Charles Willson Peale, 1796–1825, The Pennsylvania Magazine of History and biography, 154 pages; E'book
 ——; Smith, James Morton, (ed.) (1995). The Republic of Letters: The Correspondence between Thomas Jefferson and James Madison, 1776–1826, 3 vols.
 Taylor, John (1804). A defence of the measures of the administration of Thomas Jefferson, Volume 40, Issue 3, Printed by Samuel H. Smith, 136 pages; E'book1, E'book2

 ——; Washington, H. A. (ed.) (1853). The Writings of Thomas Jefferson: Autobiography, with appendix. Correspondence, J. C. Riker, 615 pages; E'book
 ——; Washington, Henry Augustine (ed.) (1907). The Writings of Thomas Jefferson Vol.19, Taylor & Maury, Sec. 1: 502 pages; Sec. 2: xxxi pages; Sec.b3: 336 pages; Sec. 4: 273 pages; E'book
 ——; Washington, Henry Augustine (ed.) (1854).  The Writings of Thomas Jefferson: Inaugural addresses and messages. Replies to public addresses. Indian addresses. Miscellaneous: 1. Notes on Virginia; 2. Biographical sketches of distinguished men; 3. The batture at New Orleans, Ricker, Thorne & Co., New York, 607 pages, E'book
 ——; Washington, H.A. (1861). Autobiography, with appendix. Correspondence , H. W. Derby, 615 pages; E'book
 Evans, Thomas (1802). A Series of Letters Addressed to Thomas Jefferson: Esq., President of the United States, Concerning His Official Conduct and Principles; with an Appendix of Important Documents and Illustrations, E. Bronson, Printed by Thos. Smith., 127 pages; E'book
 ——; Yarbrough, Jean M. (2006). The Essential Jefferson, Hackett Publishing, 328 pages; ; Book

See also

 Presidency of Thomas Jefferson
 Bibliography of the American Revolutionary War
 1796 United States presidential election
 1800 United States presidential election
 1804 United States presidential election
 Early life and career of Thomas Jefferson
 United States Declaration of Independence
 Thomas Jefferson and religion
 Thomas Jefferson and education
 Notes on the State of Virginia
 First Barbary War
 Louisiana Purchase
 Lewis and Clark Expedition
 Thomas Jefferson and Native Americans
 Embargo Act of 1807
 Jeffersonian democracy
 Jefferson Bible
 Thomas Jefferson and slavery
 Jefferson–Hemings controversy
 Republicanism in the United States
 Monticello and Jeffersonian architecture

Notes

References

External links
 
 "Writings of Jefferson and Madison" from American Writers: A Journey Through History, April 9, 2001

Jefferson, Thomas
Jefferson Thomas
Thomas Jefferson-related lists